Ardealul was a weekly newspaper from Chişinău, the Moldavian Republic, founded by Onisifor Ghibu in October 1917. Initially, the newspaper was published weekly, later appeared three times a week. After January 1918, its successor was the daily newspaper România Nouă.

References

Bibliography 
 Almanahul dicţionar al presei din România şi a celei româneşti de pretutindeni de G. Caliga. – București, 1926. – p. 155.

External links 
 PRESA BASARABEANĂ de la începuturi pînă în anul 1957. Catalog

Publications established in 1917
Publications disestablished in 1918
Defunct newspapers published in Moldova
Romanian-language newspapers published in Moldova
Mass media in Chișinău